Sick Boy is the second studio album by American DJ and production duo The Chainsmokers. It was released on December 14, 2018, via Disruptor and Columbia Records. The album features collaborations with French DJ Aazar and fellow American DJ NGHTMRE as well as co-production from Sly, Chris Lyon, and Shaun Frank, and writing credits from frequent co-writer Emily Warren, Kate Morgan, Drew Love of THEY., Tony Ann, Corey Sanders, and Chelsea Jade. Sick Boy's tracklist is made up of singles gradually released throughout 2018 as an attempt to increase the songs' success.

Background 
The album consists of singles that were released each month in the year 2018, except May and June, with "Sick Boy", "You Owe Me", "Everybody Hates Me" and "Somebody" being released in the first four months, from January to April. These songs were collectively released on the 'Sick Boy EP' on April 20. The next three songs, "Side Effects", "Save Yourself" and "This Feeling" were released July to September and appeared collectively alongside the first four singles on the EP 'Sick Boy...This Feeling' on September 21. "Siren", "Beach House" and "Hope" were released October to December, then collected on the final album.

Songs from the album were described as "deep and introspective", while having "bangers that sound out of place". The album was noted by Your EDM as "an improvement from Memories...Do Not Open" and "a massive step in the right direction... with the Chainsmokers a little lost on their own sound."

Critical reception

Upon release, Sick Boy received heavily mixed to negative reception from music critics.

AllMusic's Neil Z. Young positively said of the album, "Compared to their 2017 official debut, the Chainsmokers' sophomore album, Sick Boy, is more introspective, thoughtful and emotional. It's also a vast improvement on the often precious (and, frankly, boring) EDM-pop of Memories…Do Not Open." He went on to state that, "At the heart of it all, this set is dark, sometimes exciting, and a step in the right direction for the immensely popular but critically maligned duo. World-weariness and a troubled heart suit them well and managed to do some good on Sick Boy."

In sharp contrast, Laura Snapes of The Guardian gave the record a very negative review, calling it "a torrent of spew-inducing self-pity".

Track listing
Adapted from iTunes and Qobuz.

  signifies a vocal producer
  signifies a remix producer

Personnel
Adapted from Qobuz.
 Adam Alpert – executive production
 Alex Pall – production , songwriting , programming , mixing , mastering , piano , executive production
 Andrew Taggart – production , songwriting , programming , mixing , mastering , guitar , vocals 
 Aazar – production , songwriting , mixing , mastering 
 Chelsea Jade – songwriting 
 Chris Gerhinger – mastering 
 Chris Lyon – production , songwriting 
 Corey Sanders – songwriting 
 Drew Love – songwriting , vocals 
 Emily Warren – songwriting , piano , vocals 
 Jordan Stilwell – mixing 
 Kate Morgan – songwriting 
 Kelsea Ballerini – vocals 
 Matt McGuire – drums 
 Michelle Mancini – mastering 
 NGHTMRE – production , songwriting , mixing , mastering 
 Nicolas Petitfrère - mastering 
 Petra Vasuri – art direction
 Randy Merrill – mastering 
 Shaun Frank – production , programming , mixing 
 Sly – production , songwriting 
 Tony Ann – songwriting , piano 
 Winona Oak – vocals , songwriting

Charts

Weekly charts

Album

Sick Boy (EP)

Sick Boy...Beach House

Sick Boy...Save Yourself

Sick Boy...Side Effects

Sick Boy...Siren

Sick Boy...This Feeling

Year-end charts

Sick Boy (EP)

Sick Boy...Beach House

Sick Boy...Side Effects

Certifications

References

2018 albums
The Chainsmokers albums